The Arese (or Aresi, Aresio, or Arexio in ancient form) are a prominent family of the Milanese nobility.

Origins 
Originating in the comune of Arese on the outskirts of Milan and descending from the Lombard Captains of Arexio (Capitanei d'Arexio; de Cataniis de Arexio), milites who controlled the territory as feudal lords from at least the 11th century, the Arese are one of the most ancient patrician citizens of Milan, represented in the Matricula nobilium familiarum Mediolani of Ottone Visconti in 1277.

14th and 15th centuries 
During the late Middle Ages and early Renaissance, the Arese were notable as "nobiltà di toga" ("Nobles of the Robe"), aristocracy whose rank came from holding key judicial or administrative posts during the signoria of the Visconti, Dukes of Milan, and the Ambrosian Republic. Ambrogio Arese, Capitan d'Aresio (d.1388) was member of the Decurion Council, Notary of the Office of Provisions, and Chancellor of Milan under Galeazzo II Visconti. Giacomo Arese was Collegiate Jurisconsult and Ducal Sindacatore from 1406. Martino Arese (d.1427) was a wool merchant, member of the Decurion Council during the rise of Gian Galeazzo Visconti, first Duke of Milan, and made gentiluomo Ducale in 1409 during the violent reign of young Gian Maria Visconti for facilitating transition of power to Filippo Maria Visconti. During the rule of the Sforza, from 1450, the family expanded across the administration of the Duchy of Milan.

16th and 17th centuries 
The family became particularly influential in the years following the death of Ludovico Sforza, as the embattled Francesco II Sforza ceded Milan to Spanish Habsburg rule (1556–1707). In 1538 Bartolomeo II Arese, il Vecchio (1508–1562) was Treasurer-General for the Duchy of Milan under Francesco II Sforza. He acquired feudal lordship of the Pieve of Seveso under Charles V, Holy Roman Emperor, with heirs consolidating power under Philip II, King of Spain through close alliances with the Archbishops of Milan Saint Charles Borromeo and Gaspare Visconti. Marco Antonio III Arese (1550–1610) was Podestà of Cremona and Governor of Rimini under Pius IV. Giulio I Arese (1560–1627) was a founding member of the Accademia degli Inquieti in Pavia in 1594 and president of the Senate of Milan from 1619, under Phillip III. Bartolomeo III Arese (1590–1674) was president of the Senate of Milan from 1660 after leading the suppression of French conspiracy in Northern Italy for Philip IV of Spain during the Thirty Years' War and the Great Plague of Milan. Bartolomeo III's vast political influence and artistic patronage, as president of Milanese domains under Charles II and Philip V and as president of the Council of Italy, marks the height of the Arese's jurisdiction of Milan.

In the same period, Paolo Cesare Arese (1574–1644), philosopher, theologian, and Bishop of Tortona, authored Della tribolatione e suoi rimedi (1624) and Imprese Sacre (1621) in which he supports the Ptolemaic System.

18th and 19th centuries 

Following the War of the Spanish Succession, the Arese were prominent figures in Milanese cultural life, the establishment of the Cisalpine Republic, the Napoleonic Kingdom of Italy, Milanese resistance to the Austrian Empire, and Italian unification. At the start of the 18th century, General Giovanni Francesco Arese (1642–1712) formed a significant collection of paintings, praised by Montesquieu in 1728 upon his visit to Palazzo Arese in Milan. Marco VI Arese Lucini (1770–1825) was an officer of the Cisalpine Republic and the Italian Republic, appointed by Napoleon Bonaparte once making Milan its capital. His wife, Antonietta Fagnani Arese (1778–1847) was a translator of Goethe and is the subject of Ugo Foscolo's ode All'amica risanata. Francesco Teodoro Arese Lucini (1778–1835) was held in the Špilberk Castle and sentenced to death (later commuted) by Francis I, Emperor of Austria for his former alliance with Eugène de Beauharnais, Viceroy of the Napoleonic Kingdom of Italy, and for conspiring to liberate Lombardy and unite it with Piedmont.

Francesco Benedetto Arese Lucini (1805–1881) authored A trip to the prairies and in the interior of North America 1837–1838, a diary of his journey with childhood friend Luis Napoleon Bonaparte, later Napoleone III. He was an Italian Senator and unofficial ambassador of Count Camillo Cavour in Paris during establishment of the Kingdom of Italy, negotiating concession of Nice and Savoy to France. Achille Arese Lucini (1841–1904) was a military officer and member of the Chamber of Deputies of the Kingdom of Italy.

20th century 
Franco Arese Lucini, tenth count of Barlassina (1918–1994) was a prominent historian of Milan, president of the Lombardy Historical Society, and Mayor of Osnago. His research archives are held at the University of Insubria in Varese and Como.

Notable members of the House of Arese 
 Bartolomeo II il Vecchio (1508–1562)
 Paolo Cesare Arese (1574–1644)
 Giulio I Arese (1575–1627)
 Bartolomeo III Arese (1590–1674)
 Carlo IV Borromeo Arese (1657–1734)
 Antonietta Fagnani Arese (1778–1847)
 Francesco Teodoro Arese Lucini (1778–1835)
 Francesco Benedetto Arese Lucini (1805–1881)
 Giberto Borromeo Arese (1815–1885)
 Franco Arese Lucini (1918–1994)
 Matilde Borromeo Arese Taverna (1983–)
 Beatrice Borromeo Arese Taverna (1985–)

Notable homes 
 Palazzo Arese Litta (Corso Magenta, Milan)
 Palazzo Arese Pallavicini (Corso Venezia, Milan – destroyed in the bombing of Milan in World War II)
Palazzo Arese Bethlen (Via Monte di Pieta, Milan – destroyed in the bombing of Milan in World War II)
 Palazzo Arese Lucini (Osnago)
 Palazzo Arese Borromeo (Cesano Maderno)
 Palazzo Arese Jacini (Cesano Maderno)
 Palazzo Fagnani Arese (Robechetto)
 Palazzo Calcagnini Arese or Canevaro di Zoagli; U.S. Consulate General Florence (Florence)
 Casa Arese Frigerio (Bollate)
 Villa Arese (Arese)

Crest 
The heraldic emblem of the Arese are a pair of wings: a "stemma parlante" (speaking emblem), where in Milanese dialect the word for 'wings' is ar.

References

Sources 
 D. Santambrogio (Associazione Vivere il Palazzo e il Giardino Arese Borromeo) 
 Elenco delle attuali nobili famiglie patrizie milanesi / rassegnato dall'ecc.ma Città di Milano all'eccelso Tribunale araldico in esecuzione dell'editto di Governo del giorno 20 novembre 1769, a cura di Franco Arese Lucini, s.l., s.d
 G. Leti, "Il governo del duca d'Ossuna e la vita del conte Bartolomeo Arese", Colonia 1682, ristampa a cura di M. Fabi, Milano 1854.
 M. L. Gatti Perer e a.v., "Il Palazzo Arese Borromeo a Cesano Maderno", ISAL, Milano 1999.
 D. Santambrogio, "Intavolatura delle Partite per la Provintia di Cesano – Una chiave di lettura per la fortuna patrimoniale di Bartolomeo III Arese in Brianza", in "Quaderni di Palazzo Arese Borromeo", Anno I /N°. 1, Maggio 2008.
 D. Santambrogio, "I beni di Casa Arese – Conti di Barlassina nel territorio di Cesano Maderno dal 1534 al 1698", in "Quaderni di Palazzo Arese Borromeo", Anno IV /N°. 1, Maggio 2012.
 D. Santambrogio, "Consistenza del patrimonio immobiliare di Bartolomeo Arese il Vecchio a Cesano nella prima metà del Cinquecento, ovvero la genesi dell'egemonia aresiana nel nostro territorio", Anno VII /N°. 1, Maggio 2014
 S. Boldrini, "Uno stemmario milanese affrescato: lo scalone delle arme di Palazzo Arese Borromeo”, in “Quaderni di Palazzo Arese Borromeo”, Anno II /N°. 2, Novembre 2009.
 A. Spiriti, “Il Testamento di Bartolomeo III Arese”, DICOM Varese, 2004.
 P. Pissavino – G. Signorotto, “Lombardia borromaica, Lombardia spagnola”, Bulzoni Editore, 1995.
 G. Gualdo Priorato, Relatione della città e stato di Milano sotto il governo dell'ecc.mo sig. don Luigi de Guzman Ponze di Leone, Milano 1666

Further reading 
 Vivere il Palazzo e il Giardino Arese Borromeo, Associazione di volontariato culturale Cesano Maderno (in Italian)
 Storia di Milano: Antonietta Fagnani in Arese Lucini (in Italian)
 Storia di Milano: Bartolomeo Arese e il Senato di Milano (in Italian)
 R. Bonfadini, Vita di Francesco Arese con Documenti inediti, L. Roux e C. Editori, 1894 (complete text; in Italian)
 Università degli Studi dell'Insubria: Archivio Franco Arese Lucini (in Italian)

History of Milan
Italian nobility
Counts of Italy